The San Juan River Bridge (Filipino: Tulay ng Ilog San Juan), also known as Pinaglabanan Bridge, San Juan del Monte Bridge, San Juan Bridge and the Old Santa Mesa Bridge, is a bridge that connects San Juan and Manila, spanning the San Juan River. The  bridge connects the N. Domingo Street in San Juan and Old Santa Mesa Street in Manila. The location of the bridge served as a battlefield during the 1896 Philippine Revolution against the Spaniards and the 1899 Philippine–American War.

On, January 29, 1899, Colonel Luciano San Miguel, Filipino Commander had his first meeting with Colonel John M. Stotsenburg, Commander of the First Nebraska Volunteers on this bridge to discuss the boundaries of their respective forces. On February 4, 1899, an encounter between the Filipino and American forces in present-day Sampaloc, Manila led to a shooting incident and sparked the Battle of Manila.

On February 5, 2009, the National Historical Commission of the Philippines installed a historical marker on San Juan River Bridge commemorating its role to the start of the Battle of Manila.

History

Outbreak of the Philippine-American War

 

After Emilio Aguinaldo issued the Philippine Declaration of Independence at Kawit, Cavite on June 12, 1898, there still was uneasy peace around Manila following the Philippine Revolution against Spain. Filipinos revolutionaries felt that Spain simply ceded the Philippines to the United States who were determined to take over from where the Spaniards left off. American forces started to come between June and July 1898 where 8,000 were deployed around Manila and 11,000 more deployed along the Zapote Line.

On December 5, 1898, the 1st Nebraska Infantry Regiment under Colonel John M. Stotsenburg, started to camp at Santa Mesa (now part of present-day Sampaloc). Their camp was surrounded on three sides by Philippine Revolutionary Army forces led by Colonel Luciano San Miguel of the Morong Battalion. Outnumbered, the Nebraskans had to build their defenses consisting of a series of outposts. They had regular patrol around the area since they felt restless on their location.

On the evening of February 4, 1899, Private William W. Grayson, Private Orville Miller and another soldier were patrolling the area when they encountered Filipinos approaching the outpost. Grayson and Miller asked them to "Halt!" but the Filipino men continued to advance. This prompted Grayson to fire the first shots and retreated back to their line, with one Filipino lieutenant and another Filipino soldier as fatalities. This spread to the other parts of the line and sparked an exchange of shots between the Filipinos and the Americans. The first shot was previously believed to have been exchanged at the San Juan River Bridge until studies by Filipino historian Benito J. Legarda concluded that the shot was not fired at the bridge, but was instead fired at what is now the corner of Sociego Street and Silencio Street in Santa Mesa.

The following day, February 5, 1899, General Elwell Stephen Otis deployed his troops to Santa Mesa and later on sparked the Battle of Manila, just two days before the US Senate ratified the Treaty of Paris on February 6, 1899. The war that lasted till 1902 resulted in the death of more than 4,200 Americans and over 20,000 Filipino nationalists.

Contemporary history

On September 15, 2018, the bridge was demolished to give way for the construction of Metro Manila Skyway Stage 3 Section 2B, which passes over San Juan River. The barges needed to lay the foundations of the pillar sections of Skyway required the bridge's demolition to gain access to the construction area. The bridge was later reconstructed by Skyway Stage 3 proponent San Miguel Corporation through its infrastructure arm SMC Infrastructure and it reopened on March 11, 2020.

References

External links
 City of San Juan
 National Commission for Culture and the Artr
 Command Posts: A focus on military history, policy and fiction
 US Department of State, Office of the Historian

Bridges in Metro Manila
Buildings and structures in San Juan, Metro Manila
Buildings and structures in Santa Mesa
Cultural Properties of the Philippines in Metro Manila
History of Manila